Incredible Love is Chris Brokaw's third solo album, the follow-up to 2003's Wandering As Water.

Background 
Released on October 25, 2005, Incredible Love was recorded in 2004 between the months of March and September. Whilst the album itself was recorded and mixed by Paul Q. Kolderie at Camp Street, Cambridge, MA, in between August and September 2004, the basic tracks on "Blues for the Moon", "Move", and "My Idea" were recorded by Andy Hong at Kimchee, in Cambridge, MA, in March 2004. The album was mastered by Alan Douches at West West Side. 
 
All songs were written by Chris Brokaw, with the exception of "My Idea" and "I Remember". "My Idea" was co-written by Brokaw and Tom Morgan and was originally covered by Evan Dando in his 2003 solo album Baby I'm Bored. "I Remember" was co-written by Alan Vega and Martin Rev of Suicide and was originally released as the B-side to their "Cheree" single.
 
Performing with Brokaw in the studio were Jeff Goddard from Karate and Kevin Coultas from Rodan, with both of whom Brokaw had worked in 1996 during the recording of Come's third album, Near-Life Experience, as well as Noah Chasin from Harm Farm, Matt Kadane from Bedhead and The New Year, and David Michael Curry and Jonah Sacks, both from Empty House Cooperative.

Track listing 
All songs composed by Chris Brokaw, unless otherwise noted.

Personnel 
 Chris Brokaw – Vocals, Guitars, Bass, Drums, Percussion 
 Noah Chasin – Violin on "X's For Eyes" 
 Kevin Coultas – Drums on "The Information Age", "Whose Blood", "Cranberries", "Gringa" 
 Dave Curry – Viola on "X's For Eyes", "My Idea" 
 Jeff Goddard – Bass on "The Information Age", "Whose Blood", "Cranberries", "Gringa" 
 Matt Kadane – Piano on "The Information Age" 
 Jonah Sacks – Cello on "X's For Eyes 
 
Additional personnel 
 
 Paul Q. Kolderie – Producer, Mixing
 Andy Hong – Pre-Production 
 Alan Douches – Mastering
 Chris Brokaw – Photography
 Jill Simonsen – Layout 
 Elisha Wiesner – Additional Producer

 Critical reception 
Time Out New York stated that "Brokaw's arresting new album, Incredible Love, is the work of an assured veteran, rewarding down to the last detail." Jill LaBrack, writing for PopMatters, begins her review of the album by stating that "[t]here are some (me) who believe that every rock record would be better if only Chris Brokaw would play guitar on it", finally concluding that Incredible Love proves that "Chris Brokaw may be known as the guitar guy in some great bands, but now he should be heralded for what he has accomplished primarily by himself." 
 
David Sheppard, writing for BBC's Collective, noted that "Incredible Love finally unveils [Chris Brokaw's] sandpapery voice, marrying it convincingly with the crisp combo arrangements", adding that Brokaw handles vocals "with the swagger of a veteran frontman." Mike Diver, reviewing the album for Drowned in Sound, proclaimed that "[r]epeated listens suck you in with ease, making Incredible Love an unexpected early highlight of 2006's singer-songwriter releases." Mojo magazine's four star review declared that "stark, against-the-odds beauty is Incredible Love's USP." Mike Wolf, the music editor of Time Out New York, named Incredible Love'' the best album of 2005: "A talent that first appeared on the radar 15 years ago, this singer-songwriter and guitarist delivers his masterwork."

References

External links 
 Allmusic Review 
 Chris Brokaw's Official Website

Chris Brokaw albums
2005 albums